Homburg is a town in Saarland, Germany and the administrative seat of the Saarpfalz district. With a population of  43,029 inhabitants (2022), it is the third largest town in the state. The city offers over 30,000 workplaces. The medical department of the University of Saarland is situated here. The city is also home to the Karlsberg beer brewery. Major employers include Robert Bosch GmbH, Schaeffler Group and Michelin.

Geography
Homburg is located in the northern part of the Saarpfalz district, bordering Rhineland-Palatinate. It is 16 km from Neunkirchen and 36 km from Saarbrücken.

The city districts are situated in the Blies valley or on its tributaries Erbach, Lambsbach and Schwarzbach.

Homburg is composed of Homburg center and nine city districts: Beeden, Bruchhof-Sanddorf, Einöd, Erbach, Jägersburg, Kirrberg, Reiskirchen, Schwarzenbach and Wörschweiler.

Einöd includes: Einöd, Ingweiler and Schwarzenacker; Jägersburg includes Jägersburg, Altbreitenfelderhof and Websweiler; Erbach includes Erbach, Lappentascherhof and Johannishof.

Demographics

Actual (as of 1 August 2022):

History

The Hohenburg Castle, nowadays a ruin, was in the 12th Century the seat of the counts of Homburg. In 1330 the village received the town status (Stadtrecht) by Louis the Bavarian.

Politics
Since the administration reform 1974 Homburg has a Lord Mayor, before that it used to have a Mayor.

Rüdiger Schneidewind (SPD) has been Lord Mayor of Homburg since October 1, 2014.

Main sights

Schlossberg Caves
Louisenthal Castle
Karlsberg Castle
Wörschweiler Abbey

Transport
Homburg (Saar) Hauptbahnhof is the main railway station in the town, served by long-distance and regional trains. By road transport, the town is served by the motorways A6 (exit Homburg) and A8 (exits Limbach and Einöd).

Notable people
Horst Ehrmantraut (born 1955), footballer
Stefan Eck (born 1956), politician (former Tierschutzpartei, currently independent)
Andreas Walzer (born 1970), cyclist
Michael Jakosits (born 1970), sports shooter
Markus Heitz (born 1971), fantasy author
Timo Bernhard (born 1981), sports car racer
David Bardens (born 1984), physician
Laura Steinbach (born 1985), handball player
Kelly Piquet (born 1988), Brazilian blogger and model

Twin towns – sister cities

Homburg is twinned with:
 La Baule-Escoublac, France (1984)
 Ilmenau, Germany (1989)
 Albano Laziale, Italy (2018)

References

External links

 Official website
 Literature about Homburg
 Kloster Wörschweiler

 
Towns in Saarland
Saarpfalz-Kreis
Palatinate (region)